De Vampyrica Philosophia is the debut solo studio album by Italian extreme metal vocalist Lord Vampyr, released on 6 February 2005 through Officina Rock Records. The album was Lord Vampyr's first release following his departure from Theatres des Vampires. The title is a pun on the famous occult treatise De Occulta Philosophia.

The spoken-word portion of the track "De Vampyrica Philosophia" was taken from the opening lines of the 2003 film The Order, and the instrumentation is sampled from the 1992 film Bram Stoker's Dracula.

Tracks 6 and 7 contain quotations from poems by Oscar Wilde.

Track listing

 "Die Herrschaft des Blutes" is German for "Reign of Blood".

Personnel
 Lord Vampyr (Alessandro Nunziati) – vocals, drum programming
 Count Morgoth (Roberto Cufaro) – guitars, keyboards
 Alexiel – keyboards
 Nighthorn (Silvano Leone) – bass
 Stefano Morabito – production, additional guitars (track 8)

External links
 Lord Vampyr's official website

2005 debut albums
Lord Vampyr albums